Mérélessart is a commune in the Somme department in Hauts-de-France in northern France.

Geography

Population

Places of interest
 Saint-Martin's church. Known for the painting "La Charité de Saint-Martin" (listed as a 'Monuments Historiques' and restored  2005-2006), it was painted in 1854 by the artist Isidore Patrois .
 The chapel
 The wrought-iron Calvary
 The war memorial

See also
Communes of the Somme department

References

External links

 Intercommunity website 

Communes of Somme (department)